The Devil in Love may refer to:
The Devil in Love (film), a 1966 film by Ettore Scola
The Devil in Love (novel), a 1772 novel by Jacques Cazotte
The Devil in Love (opera), a Russian opera based on Cazotte's novel with music by Alexander Vustin
The Devil in Love, a 1974 romance  novel by Barbara Cartland

See also
The Devil's in Love, a 1933 American film